Gunwi is a town, or eup in Gunwi County, North Gyeongsang Province, South Korea. The township Gunwi-myeon was upgraded to the town Gunwi-eup in 1979. Gunwi County Office and Gunwi Town Office are located in Dongbu-ri, which is crowded with people.

Communities
Gunwi-eup is divided into 17 villages (ri).

References

External links
Official website 

Gunwi County
Towns and townships in North Gyeongsang Province